The Thomas M. and Alla M. Paterson House is a house located at 7807 North Denver Avenue in Portland, Oregon. It was listed on the National Register of Historic Places on March 5, 1998.

See also
 National Register of Historic Places listings in North Portland, Oregon

References

External links
 Paterson, Thomas M. and Alla M., House (Portland, Oregon), UO Libraries

1909 establishments in Oregon
Bungalow architecture in Oregon
Houses completed in 1909
Houses on the National Register of Historic Places in Portland, Oregon
Kenton, Portland, Oregon